Pools of Sorrow, Waves of Joy is the debut solo album of Dutch composer, singer, and multi-instrumentalist Arjen Anthony Lucassen, released under the name Anthony. He sang leading vocals and played most of the instruments himself. However unlike most of his future works Lucassen doesn't play bass, with Peter Vink (future member of Lucassen's band Star One and future contributor of Lucassen's project Ayreon) playing all bass.

The name of the album comes from the song "Across the Universe" (by The Beatles), one of Lucassen's favorite songs. Even though the album spawned three singles with radio spots, it flopped commercially.

Track listing

Personnel

Musicians 

 Arjen Anthony Lucassen - lead and backing vocals, guitars, banjo, mandolin, lute, keyboards and drum programming
 Peter Vink - bass
 Cleem Determeijer - keyboards
 Debbie Schreuder - backing vocals
 Mirjam van Doorn - backing vocals

Additional personnel 

 Arjen Anthony Lucassen - producing and mixing
 Oscar Holleman - assistant producing, engineering and mixing
 Mario Schulz - engineering and mixing
 Peter Brussée - Mastering
 Niels van Iperen - Photography

References

External links 

Arjen Anthony Lucassen albums
1993 debut albums